The 1973 Commercial Union Assurance Masters was a tennis tournament played on indoor carpet courts at Hynes Auditorium in Boston, Massachusetts in the United States. Mateflex is a soft plastic, interlocking tile court, with the slower ball speed of clay but the low maintenance of a hard surface. It was the fourth edition of the Masters Grand Prix and was held from December 4 through December 8, 1973. Ilie Năstase won his third consecutive Masters title and earned $15,000 prize money.

Finals

Singles

 Ilie Năstase defeated  Tom Okker 6–3, 7–5, 4–6, 6–3
 It was Năstase's 24th title of the year and the 58th of his career.

References

External links
 ITF tournament edition details

 
Masters
Grand Prix tennis circuit year-end championships
Tennis tournaments in the United States
Commercial Union Assurance Masters, 1973
Commercial Union Assurance Masters, 1973
Commercial Union Assurance Masters